No. 655 Squadron RAF was a unit of the Royal Air Force during the Second World War. Numbers 651 to 663 Squadrons of the RAF were Air Observation Post units working closely with Army units in artillery spotting and liaison. A further three of these squadrons, 664–666, were manned with Canadian personnel. Their duties and squadron numbers were transferred to the Army with the formation of the Army Air Corps on 1 September 1957.

History
No. 655 Squadron was formed at RAF Old Sarum, Wiltshire, on 30 November 1942 and went into action on August 1943 in North Africa. From December 1943, it served in Italy, where it remained until disbanding at Ronchi on 31 August 1945. 655 Avn. Sqn. Army Air Corps was the 1st (BR) Corps support Squadron at Detmold in West Germany, during the days of the British Army of the Rhine. 655 Sqn., (The Scottish Horse), a title used to remember the unit's connections with its R.A.F. precedents, and the Italian campaign, provided battlefield support, observation, casevac, and Anti Tank Guided Weapon operations in the forward area in the event of the then expected European War. As in common with all A.A.C. units at that time 655 Squadron operated Westland upgraded Bell 47 G4 and Westland 'Scout'AH Mk'1 Helicopters.

Aircraft operated

See also
List of Royal Air Force aircraft squadrons
No. 679 (The Duke of Connaught's) Squadron AAC

References

Notes

Bibliography

External links
 Squadron histories for nos. 651–670 squadron on RAFWeb

655 Squadron
Aircraft squadrons of the Royal Air Force in World War II
Military units and formations established in 1942